Timpuri Noi is a Romanian alternative rock band.

History

Timpuri Noi was formed in 1980, and remained an underground act up until 1991. This was mainly due to what was perceived as "subversive lyrical content" in the Ceauşescu era. Incidentally, the name derives from a cliché of the period: its literal meaning is "New Times" (in the sense of "New Age"), used to signify Marxist Socialism. The tongue-in-cheek reference is somehow associated with the Bucharest metro station of the same name (see: Timpuri Noi). The name is also the Romanian translation of Modern Times, the title for Charles Chaplin's classic 1936 film.

In the early nineties, up to around 1995, the band was arguably the top Romanian act. Around the time, they had the opportunity to be the opening act for rather prestigious (albeit musically different) foreign acts during concerts in Bucharest: Ian Gillan and Uriah Heep in 1992, Scorpions in 1993, Saxon, Paradise Lost and Jethro Tull in 1994, Iron Maiden and Kreator in 1995, Eros Ramazzotti, Joe Cocker and Rod Stewart later in the same year.

1994 also signified an important event in both Timpuri Noi's career and Romanian music in general: Timpuri Noi gives the very first unplugged performance in this country, recorded as an album in the same year (see below).

In 1997, the band was presented with one of the MCM French music television and Radio France Internationale "Decouvertes de Rock a l'Est" (Eastern European New Acts) Awards, performing in a special gala concert. (The previous year, Timpuri Noi had been interviewed for MTV Europe during the Golden Stag Festival in the Romanian city of Braşov.)

The band split in 2001, with members becoming involved in personal projects - Partizan for Artan, ZIDD (sometimes mentioned as "Zid" - Romanian for "wall") for Dan Iliescu. These projects were short-lived, since Timpuri noi re-united in 2005, releasing a new record called "Back in Business". In 2009, Artan leaves the group, due to disagreements with Dan Iliescu.

As of 2020, the group is still active, playing live sporadically throughout the country. They released a new full-length called "Moldova Mon Amour".

Lineup

Original lineup
 Adrian Pleşca (Artan) – lead vocals
 Dan Iliescu – guitar, backing vocals
 Răzvan Moldovan – drums

Current lineup
 Dan Iliescu – guitar and vocals
 Vlad Apotrosoaei – bass guitar, backing vocals
 Felix Sfura – drums and percussion, backing vocals

Other band members over the years
1982:  Sorin Petroianu – guitar
1982:  Sorin Tirichiţă – bass guitar
1984 – 1985, 1990:  Marian Ionescu – bass guitar
1984 – 1985, 1990:  Luminita Mihaescu – keyboards, vocals
1986 – 1988, 1990:  Radu Cartianu – bass guitar
1983, 1990 – 1991:  Sorin (Croco) Badea – bass guitar
1991:  Marian Mihăilescu – bass guitar
1991:  Costel Joiţa – drums
1992 – 2001:  Cătălin Neagu – drums
1992 – 1995:  Marian Moldoveanu – guitar
1992 – 1998:  Adrian Borțun – bass guitar
1998 – 2000:  Cătălin Răsvan – bass guitar
2000 – 2001:  Florin Barbu – bass guitar
2005 – 2010:  Silviu Sanda – bass guitar
2005 – 2010:  Andrei Barbulescu – drums
2007 – 2008:  Victor Rivalet – keyboards, samplers, groove machine
2009 – 2010: Vladimir Sateanu (Vlady) – bass guitar
Florin Tuliga – programming
Aurel Parocescu – samplers and drum machines

In some concerts, the band would add two backing female singers to its lineup (whether vocalists or violinists): the official site mentions Denis Iliescu, Crina Godescu and Maria Radu as its main collaborators.

Discography
Formaţii Rock Nr. 11 (Electrecord, 1988; split EP along with the band 'Contrast' from Suceava), last 3 tracks (LP)
Timpuri Noi (Cartianu SRL, 1992) (LP, MC)
Timpuri Noi Unplugged (VIVO, 1994) (CD, MC)
De regiune superior (VIVO, 1995) (CD, MC)
Basca Abundenţei (MediaPro Music, 1998) (CD, MC)
Lucky Nights Unplugged (MediaPro Music, 2000) split, last 7 tracks (CD, MC)
Back in Business (MediaPro Music, 2006) (CD, MC)
Deschide-ți mintea (MHO, 2012) (CD)
Moldova Mon Amour (LUNA PR & EVENTS, 2020) (CD)

Notes and references

External links
  Fan site
  Album reviews

Musical groups established in 1983
Romanian alternative rock groups